Fox is a hamlet in the civil parish of Amport in the Test Valley district of Hampshire, England. Its nearest town is Andover, which lies approximately 4.8 miles (7.7 km) north-east from the hamlet.

Villages in Hampshire
Test Valley